Jame'eh was a Persian language reformist newspaper published in Tehran briefly between February and June 1998. Geneive Abdo described it as the first free newspaper in Iran.

History and profile
Jameah was launched on 5 February 1998. Mohsen Sazegara was one of the three founders of the paper. Hamidreza Jalaeipour was the publisher. The paper gradually became one of the most read newspapers in Iran selling 300,000 copies. It was a supporter of Mohammad Khatami and frequently covered news about the US movies. In June 1998 the license of the paper was cancelled due to its allegedly insulting news about the head of the Revolutionary Guards, Rahim Safavi. Following this incident the paper was banned by the Iranian government and was succeeded by another reformist newspaper Tus which was started in July 1998. The editorial staff of the newspaper was same with those of Jameah, but it was soon shut down. Then the reformists launched another newspaper, Neshat.

References

1998 establishments in Iran
1998 disestablishments in Iran
Banned newspapers
Censorship in Iran
Defunct newspapers published in Iran
Newspapers established in 1998
Persian-language newspapers
Publications disestablished in 1998